Viravarman was the king of Chenla.

Biography 
King Viravarman was not from the House of Kaundinya (Lunar Dynasty). He was referred to in an inscription as the son of Sārvabhauma, the founder of the Chenla capital, Bhavapura. He was the father of King Mahendravarman and stepfather of King Bhavavarman I, who was the son of King Prathivīndravarman.

References

Cambodian monarchs
6th-century Cambodian monarchs